"The Magic Cauldron" is an essay by Eric S. Raymond on the open-source economic model. It can be read freely online and was published in his book 1999 book, The Cathedral and Bazaar.

Contents
The essay analyzes the economic models that Raymond believes can sustain an open-source project in four steps:
 It first analyzes what the author sees as classical myths about the cost refund in software development and tries to present a game-theory based model of the supposed stability of open-source cooperation.
 Secondly, it presents nine theoretical models that would work for sustainable open-source development: two non-profit, seven for-profit.
 Thirdly it states a theory to decide when it is economically interesting for software to remain closed.
 Finally, it examines some mechanisms that, according to Raymond, the market invented to fund for-profit open-source development (like patronage system and task markets).

Publication

See also
 Revenge of the Hackers

References

External links
 

1999 essays
Computer science books
Books about free software
O'Reilly Media books
Software development philosophies
Open Publication License-licensed works
Works about the information economy
Essays by Eric S. Raymond